Dhiego de Souza Martins ( born 27 August 1988 in Brazil), sometimes known as just Dhiego, is a Brazilian professional footballer who is currently a free agent.

Club career

South China
On 29 December 2011, South China announced that Dhiego Martins, alongside João Emir and Yeo Jee-hoon, had joined the club. He made his debut for South China on 4 February 2012 at Mong Kok Stadium, scoring two goals to help the team secure a 4–2 win over Sunray Cave JC Sun Hei.

Skënderbeu Korçë
In August 2014, Martins accepted a transfer move to the reigning Albanian champions, Skënderbeu Korçë.

Tai Po
In June 2017, Dhiego Martins was released by Pegasus and later signed with Tai Po.

Southern
On 26 May 2018, Dhiego Martin moved to fellow HKPL club Southern. On 1 June 2019, Southern announced that his contract would be renewed for a further season.

On 19 April 2020, due to circumstances brought on by the 2020 coronavirus pandemic, Southern bought out the remainder of Dhiego Martins' contract.

Career statistics

References

External links
 

1988 births
Living people
Association football forwards
Brazilian footballers
South China AA players
KF Skënderbeu Korçë players
Shamakhi FK players
Hong Kong Premier League players
Kategoria Superiore players
Azerbaijan Premier League players
Expatriate footballers in Hong Kong
TSW Pegasus FC players
Tai Po FC players
Southern District FC players
Hong Kong League XI representative players